See Ferrari 365 P2 for the race car

The Ferrari 365 P Berlinetta Speciale (also commonly referred to as the Berlinetta Tre-posti) was a concept sports car designed and produced by Pininfarina and Ferrari in 1966. It featured a mid-engined layout of a donor racing car chassis and three-seat arrangement with a central driving position, as later popularised on McLaren F1. It was the first purpose-built, mid-engined, road-going Ferrari-branded car. Other similar Ferraris at that time were road-usable race cars like the 250 LM 'Stradale'.

Development
The conversion of racing cars’ engine position from the front to the rear-mid position, did start to slowly influence the automakers to produce road cars with this specification. The first production car with this configuration was the 1962 René Bonnet Djet. With this change so did the requirements for styling to match new mechanicals. Creation of the mid-engined, road-going sports car was inevitable and Pininfarina created three Ferrari-based prototypes to be at the forefront of this revolution. One of those projects was the "Tre-posti" or a three-seater in Italian, the Ferrari 365 P Berlinetta Speciale.

Sergio Pininfarina was responsible for the initiation of the project as soon to be Head of Pininfarina. Up to this point Enzo Ferrari steadfastily refused to create a road-going car with a V12 engine in the mid-rear position and to involve an untraditional design language. Both US Ferrari importer Luigi Chinetti and Head of Fiat Gianni Agnelli were interested in acquiring such cars for themselves.

While Ferrari did not immediately create any road cars in this specification, the Berlinetta Speciale did influence the marque's future styling and eventually the 365 GT/4 Berlinetta Boxer prototype emerged by 1971.

Design

The exterior design was loosely based on the existing road-going Dino concept, already sporting a mid-engine layout and presented just a year earlier, in 1965. Aldo Brovarone as Pininfarina’s soon to be Head of Styling and creator of all the road-going Dino exterior designs, is also credited with the Berlinetta Speciale. Because of the many similarities to the production Dino 206 GT, the Berlinetta Speciale is both seen as a scaled up version of the original Dino and its predecessor, presented at the same time as the Dino Berlinetta GT final prototype, in 1966.

Pininfarina created the bodies in aluminium, over a mid-engine competition chassis. The most unusual feature was the triple seating with the driver situated in the center and rest on the seats slightly back. The center-mount windshield wiper was carried from the donor race car. New were the luxury additions like leather seats, carpets, chrome bumpers and fittings.
The overall shape was very similar to both the Dino Berlinetta Speciale and more so to the Dino Berlinetta GT, the final prototype before the production variant. Apart from the seating arrangement, also the overall dimensions and shape were altered to accommodate a bigger V12 powerplant. The Ferrari Berlinetta Speciale was also known as "Tre-Posti" for its unique seating design.

Additional features included a full fixed Perspex sunroof, originally installed on one of the examples, that was highly advanced for its time. Overall side profile and details like a visible fuel cap, tearshaped air vents were similar to the Dino counterparts. Inside the chrome roll bar was integrated for additional protection.

Examples
Only two examples were ever created with various distinctive details, both in 1966.

Chassis 8971

Two racing chassis of the 365/P2 type were used by Pininfarina to create the usable concept cars. The first of them was buillt on chassis 8971 and was the one destined to be a show car. Completed in September 1966 and finished in Garenia White paint, the first example was presented, in October the same year, at the Paris Motor Show on Pininfarina stand. Interior, with the three seats, were upholstered in a black imitation leather. It was however lacking any running gear at that time.

The Berlinetta Speciale chassis 8971, was presented all around the world on numerous occasions during 1966 and 1967, appearing at Earl's Court in London, Brussels, Geneva, and Los Angeles motor shows and salons. After the show tour, US Ferrari importer Luigi Chinetti, acquired the car in May 1967. It was invoiced by Ferrari for the racing chassis with modifications and by Pininfarina for the bodywork and tooling bills. The reported price was around US$21,160, without shipping costs. Chinetti soon sold and bought back the car twice to his customers, at first to a New York banker for US$26,000.

From 1969, the Berlinetta Speciale remained in the Chinetti family, being used by Chinetti's son Luigi "Coco" Chinetti Junior. In 2014 Gooding & Co. offered the car for sale and even though the reserve was not met and the car unsold, the high bid was US$23.5 million.

Chassis 8815

The second example, chassis 8815, was reportedly commissioned by Head of Fiat Gianni Agnelli himself, upon seeing the first example presented at the Paris Motor Show. He took delivery of the car sometime in 1966.
This example was finished in metallic grey with black-painted line along the length of the car. Originally it had no sunroof but had it installed early on. The car was delivered with a large, chromed rear spoiler and with fabric covered seats and during its lifetime was repainted in metallic blue and then red.

Specifications

Engine and transmission
Cars were powered by a racing Colombo 60° V12 engine, carried over from the Ferrari 365 P2, with SOHC valvetrain actuating two valves per cylinder. It was mounted in the rear mid-engine, rear-wheel-drive layout of the car, lognitudinally with the transaxle-type, 5-speed manual gearbox.

Engines also retained the dry-sump lubrication system from the racing specification. Engine was not detuned as compared to the original.

Chassis and suspension
The mid-engine, tubular competition chassis was similar to that of Ferrari 330 P2 and taken from the 365 P2 customer version, the same as used by Luigi Chinetti’s NART team in 1965, with addition of a roll bar and cast aluminium wheels.

Cars had independent suspension front and back, with unequal-length wishbones, coil springs, telescopic shock absorbers and an anti-roll bars. The four wheel disc brakes were servo-assisted.

See also
 Dino Berlinetta Speciale

References

Bibliography

External links

365 P Jewel: Ferrari History

365 P Berlinetta Speciale
Pininfarina vehicles
Coupés
Rear mid-engine, rear-wheel-drive vehicles
Sports cars
Cars introduced in 1966
365 P Berlinetta Speciale